Keith Edward Simpson (born March 9, 1956) is a former NFL defensive back. He played his entire eight-season career for the Seattle Seahawks.

References

1956 births
Living people
Players of American football from Memphis, Tennessee
American football cornerbacks
American football safeties
Memphis Tigers football players
Seattle Seahawks players